Garrett Nicholas Cooper (born December 25, 1990) is an American professional baseball first baseman for the Miami Marlins of Major League Baseball (MLB). He previously played for the New York Yankees.

Early life and education
Garrett Nicholas Cooper was born on December 25, 1990. He was raised in Rancho Palos Verdes, California. He attended Loyola High School in Los Angeles. As a senior, he hit .397 with four home runs and 25 RBIs. After high school, he enrolled and played college baseball at El Camino College and Auburn University. In 2013, his senior year at Auburn, he slashed .354/.481/.540 with seven home runs and 37 RBIs in 56 games.

Minor League career

Milwaukee Brewers
The Milwaukee Brewers selected Cooper in the sixth round of the 2013 Major League Baseball draft. He signed and spent 2013 with both the Helena Brewers and the Wisconsin Timber Rattlers, batting a combined .283 with six home runs and 30 RBIs in 48 total games between both teams. In 2014, he played for Wisconsin, the AZL Brewers, and the Brevard County Manatees, slashing .262/.347/.390 with four home runs and 27 RBIs between the three clubs, and in 2015, he played for Brevard County and the Biloxi Shuckers, posting a combined .310 with eight home runs and 59 RBIs. Cooper spent 2016 with Biloxi and the Colorado Springs Sky Sox where he compiled a .292 batting average with nine home runs, 69 RBIs. He began 2017 back with Colorado where he slashed .366/.428/.652 with 17 home runs and 82 RBIs in 75 games.

Major League career

New York Yankees
On July 13, 2017 Cooper was traded to the New York Yankees in exchange for left handed pitcher Tyler Webb. The Yankees promoted Cooper to the major leagues on July 14, and he made his debut that day against the Boston Red Sox at Fenway Park. On July 16, Cooper got his first MLB hit off David Price. In 13 games for the Yankees, he batted .326 with five doubles and six RBIs. He also spent time with the Trenton Thunder and Scranton/Wilkes-Barre RailRiders while with the Yankees organization.

Miami Marlins
On November 20, 2017, Cooper was traded to the Miami Marlins along with Caleb Smith in exchange for pitcher Mike King and international bonus pool money. On March 25, 2018, the Marlins announced the Cooper had made the Opening Day roster. He was placed on the disabled list at the beginning of May, and was activated at the beginning of July.

Cooper hit his first major league home run on May 22, 2019, off Detroit Tigers pitcher Daniel Norris. It was the 39th game he had played in the major leagues. The next day, he hit his second home run, a grand slam, off Detroit pitcher Shane Greene with two outs in the top of the ninth inning; Miami went on to defeat Detroit 5–2. He finished the 2019 season hitting .281/.344/.446 with 15 home runs and 50 RBIs in 381 at bats over 107 games.

In the pandemic-shortened 2020 season, Cooper batted .283/.353/.500 with 6 home runs and 20 RBIs in 34 games.

On July 28, 2021, it was announced that Cooper had suffered a partial UCL tear in his left elbow and would require season-ending surgery. He was subsequently placed on the 60-day injured list. He finished the 2021 season batting .284/.380/.465 with 9 home runs and 33 RBIs in 71 games.

On March 22, 2022, Cooper signed a $2.5 million contract with the Marlins, avoiding salary arbitration. On July 12, 2022  Cooper was named as MLB All-Star Game N.L. roster replacement for Bryce Harper due to injury.

On September 27, 2022, Cooper suffered a fractured finger after getting hit by a pitch in the 6-3 win over the New York Mets

On January 13, 2023, Cooper agreed to a one-year, $4.2 million contract with the Marlins, avoiding salary arbitration.

Personal life
Cooper and his wife, Erica, had their first child in March of 2022.

References

External links

1990 births
Living people
Baseball players from Torrance, California
Major League Baseball first basemen
New York Yankees players
Miami Marlins players
National League All-Stars
El Camino Warriors baseball players
Auburn Tigers baseball players
Helena Brewers players
Wisconsin Timber Rattlers players
Brevard County Manatees players
Arizona League Brewers players
Biloxi Shuckers players
Colorado Springs Sky Sox players
Trenton Thunder players
Scranton/Wilkes-Barre RailRiders players
Jupiter Hammerheads players
New Orleans Baby Cakes players
Jacksonville Jumbo Shrimp players